Roman Lazarevich Karmen (real name Efraim Leyzorovich Korenman) (– 28 April 1978) was a Soviet film director, war cinematographer, documentary filmmaker, journalist, screenwriter, pedagogue and publicist.

Biography
Karmen was born to a Jewish family in Odessa. His father was the writer Lazar Karmen (real name Leyzor Korenman) and his mother was the translator Dina Leypuner.

Communist propaganda
Karmen was a Communist, and roamed the world portraying the Spanish Civil War, the battles for Moscow and Leningrad in World War II, the First Indochina War, and the rise of Communism in South East Asia in the 1950s and in South America during the 1960s.

Karmen was also granted personal access to the emergence of Communist leaders China's Mao Zedong, Vietnam's Ho Chi Minh and Cuba's Fidel Castro, and Chile's socialist president Salvador Allende.

Style
Karmen's documentary methods were both influential and controversial; his renowned technical ability captured the emotion of war and the repetition of key shots and framings between film projects became a hallmark, but he would often blur the lines of Cinéma vérité by restaging key battles, including the lifting of the siege of Leningrad (Ленинград в борьбе, 1942), the Viet Minh victory at the battle of Dien Bien Phu (Вьетнам, 1955), and the 1956 landing in Cuba of militants led by Fidel Castro, re-enacted as a first person documentary.

In 2001, French documentary directors Dominique Chapuis and Patrick Barbéris produced a 90-minute film, titled Roman Karmen: A Cineast In The Revolution's Service. The following year Barbéris (his co-author Chapuis had died in late 2001) published the portrait Roman Karmen, A Red Legend.

Filmography

1939: Испания (Spain), about the Spanish Civil War
1942: Ленинград в борьбе (Leningrad in the fight), about the Siege of Leningrad
1942: Разгром немецких войск под Москвой (Crushing defeat of German troops in the environs of Moscow), about the Battle of Moscow
1945: Берлин (Fall of Berlin – 1945), about the Battle of Berlin
1946: Суд народов (Judgment of the peoples), about the Nuremberg trials. An English language version of the film called The Nuremberg Trials was also made.
1953: Повесть о нефтяниках Каспия (Narrative about the oil-industry workers of the Caspian region)
1955: Вьетнам (Vietnam), about the Battle of Dien Bien Phu
1956: Утро Индии (Indian Morning)
1958: Широка страна моя... (Wide is my country…), the first Soviet motion picture produced in Kinopanorama.
1959: Покорители моря (Conquerors of the sea)
1961: Пылающий остров (Blazing island), about the Bay of Pigs Invasion
1965: Великая отечественная (Great Patriotic War), 20th anniversary of the end of the German-Soviet War
1967: Гренада, Гренада, Гренада моя… (Grenada, Grenada, my Grenada…), co-directed with Konstantin Simonov, about the Spanish Civil War
1969: Товарищ Берлин (Berlin Kamarad)
1972: Пылающий континент (Blazing continent)
1976: Сердце Корвалана (Corvalán's heart), about the imprisoned general secretary of the Communist Party of Chile, Luis Corvalán

See also
The Unknown War (TV series)
Konstantin Simonov
Leni Riefenstahl
Frank Capra
Robert Riskin
Pierre Schoendoerffer
Europe Central

Notes

External links

 Two pictures of Roman Karmen in Trung Gia conference, Vietnam, 4 July 1954 (French Defense Ministry archives ECPAD)
  Sous l’œil d’un cinéaste soviétique by Cindy Cao
  Extended filmography
 (Russian) Full filmography 

1906 births
1978 deaths
20th-century Russian male writers
20th-century Russian photographers
20th-century Russian screenwriters
Film people from Odesa
Communist Party of the Soviet Union members
Gerasimov Institute of Cinematography alumni
Academic staff of the Gerasimov Institute of Cinematography
Heroes of Socialist Labour
Honored Art Workers of the Azerbaijan SSR
People's Artists of the RSFSR
People's Artists of the USSR
Stalin Prize winners
Lenin Prize winners
Recipients of the National Prize of East Germany
Recipients of the Order of Lenin
Recipients of the Order of the Red Banner
Recipients of the Order of the Red Banner of Labour
Recipients of the Order of the Red Star
Recipients of the USSR State Prize
Cinema pioneers
Documentary war filmmakers
Odesa Jews
People of the First Indochina War
Propaganda film directors
Russian cinematographers
Russian documentary filmmakers
Russian educators
Russian film directors
Russian Jews
Russian male writers
Russian photographers
Russian propagandists
Russian screenwriters
Soviet cinematographers
Soviet documentary film directors
Soviet educators
Soviet film directors
Soviet Jews
Soviet male writers
Soviet photographers
Soviet propagandists
Soviet screenwriters
War photographers
World War II photographers
Burials at Novodevichy Cemetery